China Life Insurance Company Limited is a life insurance company in Taiwan, controlled by Koo Chen-fu family. It was established in 1963. The current chairman of the company is Alan Wang, who joined China Life in 2003 

There is no business relationship between China Life Insurance Company in Taiwan and that in Mainland China.

See also
 List of companies of Taiwan

External links

China Life Insurance Company Limited

References

1963 establishments in Taiwan
Financial services companies established in 1963
Life insurance companies of Taiwan
Companies based in Taipei
Taiwanese brands